This is a list of veterans' organizations by country.

List of veterans' organizations

International veterans' organizations
 Royal Commonwealth Ex-Services League
 War Veterans Committee
 World Association of Home Army Soldiers
 World Veterans Federation

National veterans' organizations

Australia
 Returned and Services League

Canada
Army, Navy and Air Force Veterans in Canada
Canadian Airborne Forces Association
The Royal Canadian Legion

France
 French Foreign Legion Veteran Societies Federation

Hungary
 Hungarian Royal Gendarme Veterans' Association

Indonesia
Veterans' Legion

Japan
 Kaikosha

Myanmar (Burma)
Myanmar War Veterans Organization (MWVO)

New Zealand
 Returned and Services Association

Philippines
 Association of Veterans of the Revolution

South Africa
 Memorable Order of Tin Hats
 The South African Legion
 South African Defence Force Association (SADFA)
 Council for Military Veteran Organisations (CMVO)
 South African National Military Veterans Association (SANMVA)

United Kingdom
The Royal British Legion
Victory Services Club

United States
 Academy of United States Veterans 
 Air Force Association
 Air Force Sergeants Association
 American Ex-Prisoners of War
 American G.I. Forum
 American Legion
 AMVETS
 American Veterans Committee (dissolved 2008)
 American Veterans Committee (2013–present day)
 American Veterans for Equal Rights
 Army and Navy Union
 Association of the United States Army
 Aztec Club (organized by officers of the Mexican War)
 Blinded Veterans Association
 Catholic War Veterans 
 Combat Veterans Motorcycle Association
 DAV
 Fleet Reserve Association
 Forty and Eight
 Grand Army of the Republic (dissolved 1956)
 Iraq and Afghanistan Veterans of America
 Iraq War Veterans Organization
 Jewish War Veterans
 Marine Corps League
 Military Officers Association of America
 Military Order of the Carabao (organized by officers of the Philippine Insurrection)
 Military Order of the Cootie
 Military Order of the Dragon (organized by officers of the China Relief Expedition)
 Military Order of Foreign Wars (organized by veterans of the Mexican War)
 Military Order of the Loyal Legion (organized by Union army officers)
 Military Order of the Purple Heart
 Military Order of the Stars and Bars (organized by Confederate army officers)
 Military Order of the World Wars (organized by officers of World War I)
 Montford Point Marines
 Navy League of the United States
 National Association for Black Veterans
 National Guard Association of the United States
 Navy Musicians Association
 Navy Mutual Aid Association
 Paralyzed Veterans of America
 Pearl Harbor Survivors Association (dissolved 2011)
 Polish Legion of American Veterans
 Society of American Military Engineers
 Society of the Cincinnati (organized by American Continental Army officers)
 State Guard Association of the United States
 Student Veterans of America
 Supportive Services for Veteran Families (SSVF)
 Ukrainian American Veterans
 United Confederate Veterans (dissolved 1951)
 United Spanish War Veterans (dissolved 1992)
 United States Submarine Veterans
 United States Submarine Veterans of World War II (dissolved 2012)
 Veterans' Alliance for Security and Democracy
 Veterans Bridge Home
 Veterans for Common Sense
 Veterans for Peace
 Veterans of Foreign Wars
 Vietnamese American Armed Forces Association
 Vietnam Veterans of America

References 

Veterans